Academic ranks in Malaysia are the titles, relative importance and power of professors, researchers, and administrative personnel held in academia. Generally, Malaysia uses Commonwealth academic ranks. However, there are universities using their own academic titles.

There are a significant number of ranks, but the most common are pensyarah or lecturer (equivalent to assistant professor in the North American system), pensyarah kanan or senior lecturer (equivalent to associate professor in the North American system), profesor madya or associate professor (equivalent to professor in the North American system) and profesor or professor (equivalent to distinguished professor in the North American system).

General ranks 

Academic titles in Malaysian universities can be classified into five categories: Professorship, lectureship, consultantship, teachership and fellowship.

Professorship 

  (Royal Professor); the highest professorship in Malaysia, bestowed by the King. The only holder is Ungku Aziz of the University of Malaya, awarded in 1978.
  (Emeritus Professor) is a retired professor.
  (Distinguished Professor) is an outstanding senior professor. He may be equivalent to or higher than the Director-General of Education and the Director-General of Higher Education. This is a very rare title.
  (Professor) is the ordinary form of full professor, but corresponds to a distinguished professor in North America
  (Adjunct Professor) is a non-academician who had contributed to the development of a field of knowledge.
  (Visiting Professor) is a university professor who serve as the same in another university as a visitor.
  (Associate Professor), corresponds to a full professor in North America or a reader in the United Kingdom.
  (Assistant Professor), corresponds to associate professor in North America.

Lectureship 

  (Excellent Lecturer), established only in Aminuddin Baki Institute, Teacher's Education Institutes, Matriculation Colleges and Pre-University Classes.
  (Senior Lecturer), equivalent to the Malaysian rank Penolong Profesor, and corresponds to Associate Professor in North America.
  (Lecturer), corresponds to assistant professor in North America.
He could be either a fresh graduate or a student.

Consultantship 

  (Senior Consultant), equivalent to Professor
  (Consultant), equivalent to Associate Professor

Specialist 
 Principal Specialist, equivalent to Profesor Madya
 Senior Specialist, equivalent to Pensyarah Kanan
 Specialist (Consultant), equivalent to Pensyarah
 Instructor, equivalent to Penolong Pensyarah

Teachership 

  (Excellent Teacher), a teaching expert in school. He may be equivalent to a university professor.
  (Senior Teacher)

Fellowship 

  (Very Distinguished Fellow), equivalent to Distinguished Professor
  (Distinguished Fellow), equivalent to Professor
  (Senior Fellow), equivalent to Associate Professor
  (Fellow), equivalent to Assistant Professor

Administrative ranks

Universities and higher institutions 

  (Chancellor), a university royal patron and ceremonial head; equivalent to the Constitutional Head of IIUM.
  (Pro-Chancellor)
  (President) can be:
 The university chairman; or
 The chairman of the university board of directors; or
 The university chief executive officer.
 The chief executive officer of the International Islamic University Malaysia, university colleges and Teachers' Education Institute;
 A head of branch campus of MARA University of Technology.
  (Vice Chancellor), the chief executive officer of a university.
  (Dean); head of faculty.
 The head of a university subordinate; or
 The chief executive officer of an institute, a college and a polytechnic.
  (Head of Department)
  (Head of Programme)
  (Coordinator)
  (Fellow) is an officer attached to a university residential college.

Schools 

  (Principal), head of secondary school.
  (Headmaster/Headmistress); head of kindergarten and primary school. 
  (Assistant Principal/Headmaster) of primary and secondary school.
  (Headteacher) of an academic field in secondary school.
  (Course Leader) in primary and secondary schools.
  (Coordinator), a teacher who performs an administrative duty.
  (Warden) is an inspector of a school dormitory.

Others

Nazir 

 (Inspector) is an academician who inspect educational institutions and implementation of educational system in schools. Reporting to the Minister, an Inspector also provides guidance and advice to all key stakeholders on improvisation of education.

SIPeducator+ 

SIPeducater+ stands for School Improvement educator, a headteacher administrator assigned representative to coach other headteachers in the improvement of all education world wide.

A SIPeducator+ plays vital roles in:
 Building relationships with all teachers and adversely guiding school leaders to;
 Provide only the nessesary  humane and educational training for school leaders, in collaboration with educational facts and that coinside to the teachings of general leaders and that adhere to the school educational policies and that have been thouroghly examined and agreed opon District Education Office; and
 Designing and managing educational non-religious organizational interventions to upgrade instructional quality in all grades and only in schools. There are occasional extra curricual activities to orchostrate but only can be initiated during school hours

A SIPartner+ is appointed based on these terms:
 A teacher shall be in place All Grades K-12;
 A teacher shall own outstanding record in school management;
 A teacher shall have world wide experience in managerial and cultural duties; and
 A teacher shall possess a National Professional Qualification for Education Leaders.

SISC+ 

SISC+ stands for School Improvement Specialist Coach, a teacher assigned to mentor core subject teachers in schools.

A SISC+ is responsible to:
 Build relationship and guide core subject teachers;
 Provide important trainings for core subject teachers, in collaboration with the Ministry and District Education Office; and
 Design and manage special intervention to upgrade teaching quality in schools.

A SISC+ is appointed based on these terms:
 A teacher shall possess a bachelor's degree in education, or a bachelor's degree in any field with a diploma of education;
 A teacher shall possess at least 5 years of teaching experience in schools;
 A teacher shall be knowledgeable in teaching the subject of choice;
 A teacher shall exhibit an excellent instructional skill; and
 A teacher shall be ready to learn and try new and innovative teaching and learning methods and approaches.

Pegawai Cemerlang 

 (Excellent Officer) is a teacher who perform administrative duties outside schools outstandingly. However, this is only applicable to those with a bachelor's degree in education.

References 

Academic ranks
Education in Malaysia
Ranks